Road Rules: Campus Crawl is the eleventh season of the MTV reality television series Road Rules. The cast traveled around the United States, taking part in missions at various colleges and universities. A casting special aired on June 10, 2002, and the season premiered one week later on June 17, 2002.

Cast

Original Cast

Replacement

Duration of cast 

 Table key
  = Cast Member is featured on this episode.
  = Cast Member replaces another cast member.
  = Cast Member is voted out of the show.
Notes

Missions

Episodes

After filming
Shane returned to the series as part of the alumni cast of Road Rules 2007: Viewers' Revenge. In 2014, he married Tony Beard. They were one of the first gay couples to marry in South Carolina. They split before Invasion of the Champions.

In 2007, Kendal welcomed her first son. In the subsequent year, she accused the father, Josh Henderson, of refusing to pay child support.

Darrell got married in 2017. The couple has two children.

Rachel married Natalie Gee on October 25, 2017. In the same year, Robinson gave birth to twins Jesse and Jack. In 2018, Gee gave birth to the couple's first daughter, Ari.

The Challenge

Challenge in bold indicates that the contestant was a finalist on The Challenge.

Note:  Darrell appeared on Vendettas for an elimination.

References

External links

Road Rules
2002 American television seasons